Overdrive may refer to:

Organizations
 OverDrive, Inc., a digital distributor of entertainment media
 OverDrive Media Console, a media player developed by OverDrive, Inc.
 Overdrive PC, a subsidiary of Velocity Micro

Technology
 Overdrive (mechanics), part of an automobile transmission
 FIRST Overdrive, the 2008 game for the FIRST Robotics Competition
 Response Time Compensation also known as "Overdrive", as used in LCD displays
 AMD OverDrive™ Technology for Overclocking CPU and Fan Control

Electronics
 Intel 80486 OverDrive, a CPU specifically designed for personal computer upgrades
 Pentium OverDrive, a CPU specifically designed for personal computer upgrades
 Overdrive, forcing amplifier output past maximum; see Distortion (music)

Art, entertainment and media

Fictional entities
 Overdrive (comics), a Marvel Comics supervillain
 Overdrive, a fictional film in the video game Stuntman: Ignition
 Overdrive, a fictional weapon in the video game Rez

Film and television
 MTV Overdrive, an MTV broadband video channel
 Overdrive (film), 2017 French film
 Over Drive (film), 2018 Japanese film
 OverDrive (radio show), Canadian sports television show

Games and toys
 Over Drive, an arcade racing game by Konami
 Overdrive (Transformers), a part of the Transformers toy line
 Overdrive (video game), a 1984 computer racing game for the BBC Micro and Acorn Electron
 Overdrive (1993 video game), a 1993 video game
 Overdrive, an attack form in the video game Final Fantasy X
 Overdrive, a common gameplay element in the Rock Band series
 80's Overdrive, a 2020 racing video game by Insane Code

Music

Groups
 Overdrive (band), a Serbian hardcore punk/metalcore band 
 Bachman–Turner Overdrive, a Canadian rock group

Albums
 Overdrive, a 2013 release by Belgian singer Natalia
 Overdrive (Fastlane album), a 2007 album from Surrey based alternative rock band Fastlane
 Overdrive (Shonen Knife album), a 2014 release by Japanese band Shonen Knife

Songs
 "Overdrive" (Katy Rose song), a 2003 release by American singer Katy Rose
 "Overdrive" (Ola song), a 2010 release by Swedish singer Ola
 "Overdrive", a 2010 song by Airbourne from No Guts. No Glory.
 "Overdrive", a 2014 song by Calvin Harris and Ummet Ozcan from Motion
 "Overdrive", a 2004 song by Client from City
 "Overdrive", a 2021 song by Conan Gray from Superache (Japanese edition)
 "Overdrive", a 2002 song by Drake from Honestly, Nevermind
 "Overdrive", a 1995 song by Eraserheads from Cutterpillow
 "Overdrive", a 2002 song by Foo Fighters from One by One
 "Overdrive", a 1977 song by Riot from Rock City
 "Overdrive", a 1968 song by the Steve Miller Band from Sailor
 "Stops at the Affected Area and Immediately Dissolves ~ Lunatic Udongein", known by English speakers as "Overdrive", by Japanese doujin music circle IOSYS

Publications
 Overdrive (magazine), an Indian monthly automotive magazine
 Over Drive (manga), a 2005 manga, adapted into an anime in 2007

Other uses
 Operation Overdrive (transportation), a public transportation plan for the Medway Towns, Kent, England
 Overdrive, a neckbreaker move in professional wrestling